Potato virus M (PVM) is a plant pathogenic virus.

See also 

 Viral diseases of potato

External links
ICTVdB - The Universal Virus Database: Potato virus M
Family Groups - The Baltimore Method

Carlaviruses
Viral plant pathogens and diseases